Grădiștea is a commune located in Vâlcea County, Oltenia, Romania. It is composed of nine villages: Diaconești, Dobricea, Grădiștea, Linia, Obislavu, Străchinești, Turburea, Țuțuru and Valea Grădiștei.

References

Communes in Vâlcea County
Localities in Oltenia